MHP Management- und IT Beratung (MHP) is a global consultancy based in Ludwigsburg, Germany, specializing in IT and process consulting in the automotive and manufacturing sectors.  Porsche has held an equity stake in the firm since 1999, starting at 49% and increasing over time to the current 81.8%. MHP has experienced sustained growth since its inception in 1996.

History
The firm was initially established in May 1996 by Ralf Hofmann and Lutz Mieschke.  The idea was to provide consulting services combining both business process optimization as well as IT services, with SAP software being the primary concentration of the IT services offering.  In January 1999, Porsche AG began its equity investment at 49% and MHP became their primary IT service partner.  At this point the company is known as "MHP - A Porsche Services Company". In March 2002, Porsche increased its stake to 51% and MHP became a subsidiary of Porsche AG. In June 2003, Porsche further increased its investment to 74.8% and once again in 2011 to its current level of 81.8%.  CEO Dr.-Ing Hofmann holds the remaining 18.2% ownership stake.

Services
The primary focus of consulting services is on the automotive industry (OEM's, suppliers, dealers and importers). Industry award-winning strategic innovations have been applied to clients in other industries.

At the international level MHP advises its clients both strategically and operationally.

Locations
Clients are supported by more than 4000 employees at 19 offices in:

 Germany
 Ludwigsburg (Headquarters, 2 locations)
Film- und Medienzentrum
Schlossgut Harteneck
 Stuttgart
 Walldorf
 Munich
 Nuremberg
 Essen
 Wolfsburg
 Berlin
 Frankfurt am Main

 United StatesMHP Americas Inc.
 Atlanta - co-located at Porsche Cars North America headquarters

 RomaniaMHP Consulting Romania SRL
 Cluj-Napoca
 Timișoara

 ChinaMHP (Shanghai) Management Consultancy Co. Ltd.
 Shanghai

 United KingdomMHP Consulting UK Limited
 Reading

Corporate social responsibility

For over a decade, MHP has sustainably supported social projects and facilities through its internal program MHPCares.  Projects are in areas that have a direct relation to the employees or their families. Employees are encouraged to participate in several of these on a volunteer basis.  Some examples include:
 Children's Cardiac Centre – “Olgäle Foundation” Stuttgart
 Ludwigsburger Schlossfestspiele
 MHP University Prize - a scholarship for Business Informatics students at Reutlingen University
 Formula Student Combustion “Green Team Stuttgart” engineering competition

Sponsorships
In September 2012 MHP secured the 10-year naming rights for the Arena Ludwigsburg - now known as MHP Arena.  As of the 2013-14 season MHP is also the naming rights sponsor of the Bundesliga Basketball team MHP RIESEN Ludwigsburg.

Other sponsorships include:
 Match Race Germany at Lake Constance
 Ritz-Carlton Dragon Boat Cup
 RGH Heidelberg Rugby Youth Teams

References

1996 establishments in Germany